= Lim's Café =

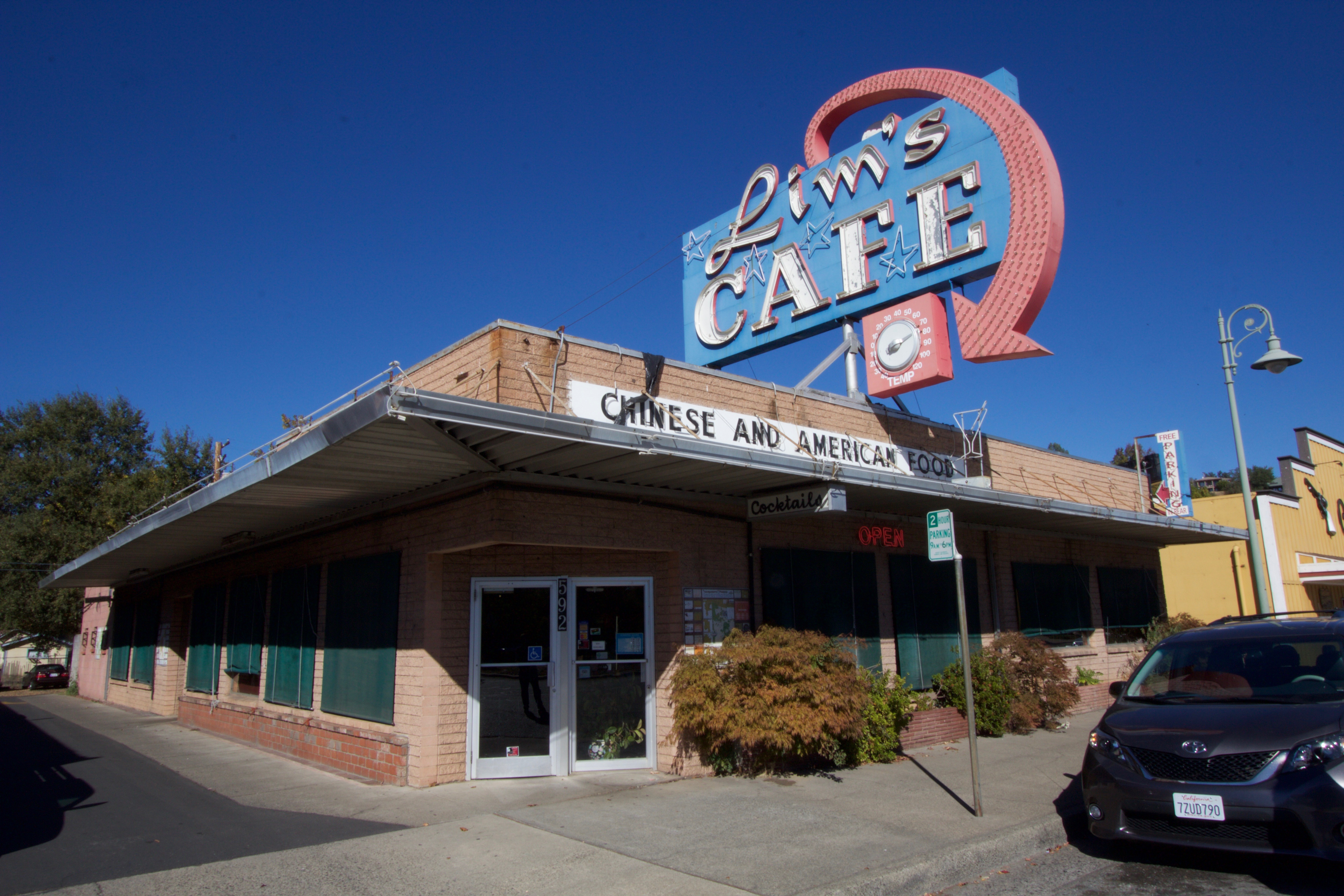

Restaurant information
- Established: 1933
- Closed: September 6, 2022
- Owners: Jeff Garret; Lon Tatom
- Previous owners: Peter Lim (1933-1994), Jeannie Lim, Ron Lim, Bonnie Lim and Pat Lee (1994-2022)
- Food type: American; Chinese
- Location: 592 N Market St, Redding, Shasta, California, 96003, United States

Lim's Café was a Chinese and American restaurant located on North Market Street in Redding, California. On August 30, 2022, it was reported that the restaurant would close on September 6 after nearly 90 years in business.

== History ==
Lim's Café was opened for business in 1933 by Peter Lim, an immigrant from China. In 1994, Lim passed the restaurant down to his daughters Jeannie Lim, Bonnie Lim, Pat Lee and son Ron who eventually sold the establishment to restaurateurs Jeff Garrett and Lon Tatom who plan to open a different restaurant on the site.
